Tillandsia didistichoides, synonym Vriesea didistichoides, is a species of flowering plant in the family Bromeliaceae, native to the Caribbean, south-east Mexico to Honduras, Colombia and Venezuela. It was first described by Carl Christian Mez in 1896.

References

didistichoides
Flora of Colombia
Flora of Cuba
Flora of the Dominican Republic
Flora of Haiti
Flora of Honduras
Flora of the Leeward Islands
Flora of Southeastern Mexico
Flora of Trinidad and Tobago
Flora of Venezuela
Flora of the Venezuelan Antilles
Plants described in 1896